During the 1960–61 English football season, Arsenal F.C. competed in the Football League First Division.

Season summary
In the 1960–61 season, the Gunners had a satisfying season where they ended up in 7th place heading into 1961, but a poor run of just four wins in their final 17 games saw Swindin's side end the campaign in a disappointing 11th place and to make things worse for Arsenal supporters, they had to witness their fierce North London rivals Tottenham win the league and cup double.

Final league table

Results
Arsenal's score comes first

Legend

Football League First Division

FA Cup

Squad

References

Arsenal F.C. seasons
Arsenal